Charles Wilbur Bateman (born in San Diego, California) is an American actor. He appeared in 76 different television programs between 1958 and 1991, as well as numerous theatrically-released and made-for-telelevision films. He is perhaps best recognized to audiences for his role as the ill-fated First Officer Larsen in the 1972 box-office smash and cinematic classic The Poseidon Adventure

Early years
Bateman's early  training in acting came at San Diego Junior College and La Jolla Playhouse as well as in a stock theater company. He was one of three children born to Thomas O. Bateman and Ivarene Cornelius Bateman. His mother died at the age of 110.

Career
Bateman's first television appearance was as "Cousin Jeff Martin" in the 1958 episode "Black Fire" of the ABC/Warner Brothers  western series Maverick, starring James Garner. He soon appeared on ABC's Lawman, Lee Marvin's NBC crime drama M Squad, and Jim Davis's syndicated adventure series, Rescue 8. He was cast as "Hess" in CBS's "Incident of a Burst of Evil" episode of the western series Rawhide. He also guest starred as a young engineer in the episode "The Tree" of CBS's Lassie, as well as two episodes of Perry Mason: Roy Dowson in "The Case of the Bashful Burro" in 1960, and defendant and title character Jeff Bronson in the 1961 episode, "The Case of the Guilty Clients."

Bateman co-starred as Detective George Peters in the first thirteen episodes of a 1959-1961 syndicated crime drama, Manhunt. Then, during the 1960-1961 season, he played the dual role of twin brothers, Rick January, M.D.,  and Marshal Ben January, in the syndicated western series Two Faces West. After Two Faces West concluded its thirty-nine episodes, Bateman guest starred on ABC's Hawaiian Eye and Ben Casey, NBC's The Virginian, Temple Houston, Bonanza, and Daniel Boone, and CBS's The Jack Benny Program, The Munsters, and Hazel.

Bateman was cast as United States Army Lieutenant Edward Fitzgerald Beale in the 1963 episode, "Stubborn Mule Hill", on the syndicated television anthology series, Death Valley Days, hosted by Stanley Andrews. David McLean played Beale's friend, Army scout Kit Carson.

In 1965, Bateman was cast as Jim Brand, a deputy sheriff in Washoe County (Reno), Nevada, in the Death Valley Days episode, "The Wild West's Biggest Train Holdup". In the story line, deputy Brand places a locked chain on a Central Pacific Railroad engine until the company agrees to pay its tax assessment. Roy Barcroft portrayed the aging Sheriff Jackson with Pat Priest as his daughter, Nora, who is romantically interested in Brand. In still another Death Valley Days appearance in 1966, "The Hero of Apache Pass", hosted by Robert Taylor, Bateman played United States Army surgeon Bernard J. D. Irwin, early recipient of the Medal of Honor based on daring exploits in an 1861 confrontation with the Apache Chief Cochise in the Arizona Territory. Phillip Pine was cast as Colonel Pitts, and Dick Simmons played Second Lieutenant George Nicholas Bascom.

In the late 1960s and early 1970s, Bateman was cast in guest-starring roles in My Three Sons, The Governor and J.J., Get Smart, Mayberry, R.F.D., The Green Hornet and Love, American Style. From 1968 to 1972, he appeared four times on ABC's crime drama The F.B.I., starring Efrem Zimbalist, Jr. He appeared six times on CBS's detective series Cannon, starring William Conrad, and twice on Mission: Impossible with Peter Graves. He also appeared twice on Mannix, starring Mike Connors and later guest starred three times on Barnaby Jones, starring Buddy Ebsen.

Bateman's first venture into soap operas was in 1980, when he joined the cast of NBC's Days of Our Lives as Maxwell Jarvis, but he left the program after a year. Thereafter, he joined the cast of the former series, Santa Barbara, in which he appeared as C.C. Capwell between 1984 and 1986. In 1985, he appeared as a military officer in the CBS miniseries, Robert Kennedy & His Times, with Brad Davis in the title role. From 1988-91, he appeared twice as two different Texas state senators on Dallas. His last acting role was in 1991 in an episode of The Trials of Rosie O'Neill.

References

External links
 

Living people
American male soap opera actors
American male television actors
Male actors from San Diego
Male actors from Los Angeles
Year of birth missing (living people)